The Plaid Tongued Devils are a Canadian musical group. Their music combines Roma, Klezmer, Ska, Rock and Jazz.

History
The Plaid Tongued Devils began as an alternative country duet with singer Ty Semaka and guitarist Alan Kolodziejzyk in 1990. The group expanded to a five piece band in 1992.

In 1998, the Devils began to develop a new style of music which they dubbed "romaklezkarock", combining Roma, Klezmer, Ska, Rock and Jazz.  In 1999 they recorded the soundtrack for the musical Klezskavania,  which was performed for the One Yellow Rabbit Theatre Company in Calgary.

The band's 2002 album, Belladonna, featured violinist  Jonathan Lewis and percussionists Chip Robb and John McNeil.

The group regularly tours in Canada and the Netherlands. Some members of the group have written and recorded songs for OpenBSD CD releases.

Discography
Running With Scissors - 1994
Tongue and Groove - 1996
In Klezkavania - 1999 (Also a theatre event)
Belladonna - 2002
Monsteroma - 2005

References

External links
Official Website
Dutch Fansite
A performance of, "The Amazing Rock 'n Roll Violinist" filmed at OJV de Koornbeurs in Delft, Netherlands

Musical groups established in 1990
Canadian folk music groups
Canadian world music groups
Klezmer groups